Clover Demarr Boykin (born Clover Demarr Smith on January 25, 1975) is an American murderer. She was born in the south of Florida, and lived in the village of Royal Palm Beach at 10000 Carmen Lane until 19 years of age. Her father left her when she was seven years old. As a child, Boykin lived from time to time with her mother, grandmother, aunt and other close relatives, and complained of beatings and abuse by her lover for 15 years.

Her first killing took place on November 16, 1993, when she was 18 and worked as a nanny for some family friends, killing 9-month-old Kayla Basante. For this murder, when it was later discovered, she received life imprisonment. The second murder took place on October 27, 1994, when she murdered her 5-month-old son, Daytona Boykin, for which she later received 40 years' imprisonment. She was arrested and charged a few days after Daytona's death, and then quickly confessed to murdering Basante, which until then was considered just an unlucky death. The sentences come with eligibility for parole after 25 years.

According to her lawyer, Alysoun B. Powell of West Palm Beach, the whole case was the result of her unhappy life, childhood confinement and parental disregard for the child's emotional needs. Powell further explained that her unfortunate childhood "sounds like a banal excuse, but that explains why some of these crimes happen, because parents do not recognize or ignore the emotional needs of their children, and when these needs are not met, this is another example of what can happen."

Clover Boykin was in an unhappy marriage with Steven Boykin, with whom she married in January while she was pregnant in the 5th month, and that he threatened to take away custody of her son. Clover had an extramarital affair in that short marriage with the silent approval of her husband. The Boykins lived at Counterpoint Estates at Royal Palm Beach in a four-bedroom house shared with Steven's mother and her sister. At the time of the murder, Steven was at work, and her mother-in-law and sister were sleeping.

Life in prison 
Immediately after the arrest, the only person who corresponded with her was her friend Joe Simpson. Kayla's father, Bill Basante, threatened in 1996 that "if she ever gets out of prison, his face would be the first she sees." Clover Boykin complained of being severely lonely because she was serving her sentence isolated from other inmates due to the nature of her crimes, and she was granted a cellmate with a similar fate in 1995, Pauline Zile, who was later transferred to Florida's Lowell C.I. prison.

She told the investigators that she killed her son after waking from a nightmare, in which she dreamt of her father raping her.

References

External links 

 Inmate Population Information Detail

1975 births
20th-century criminals
American female murderers
American murderers of children
American people convicted of murder
Filicides in Florida
Infanticide
Living people
Pages with unreviewed translations
People convicted of murder by Florida
People from Florida